Stranger to the Sun is an original novel based on the U.S. television series Angel.

Plot summary
Wesley opens a strange package that arrives by special delivery, which instantly sends him into a slumber. It seems likely he is the victim of a spell. Angel leaves with Gunn to investigate. They discover that other people who might be able to assist, such as magick-shop owners, have also fallen victim exactly like Wesley.

Meanwhile, Cordy is struggling to research without Wes available. She soon begins to uncover a plot to plunge Earth into eternal darkness, so that vampires might rule over humans. Wesley is in the midst of a horrifying nightmare. If he cannot awaken, humankind may be in for a struggle.

Tagline
"It's a night of the living dead."

Continuity

Set in Angel season 2, somewhere between "Epiphany" and "Over the Rainbow".
Characters include: Angel, Cordelia Chase, Charles Gunn, Wesley Wyndam-Pryce, Lorne.
Reference is made to the future tension between Gunn and his gang in "That Old Gang of Mine", when Gunn recruits his old gang to find out further information about whatever is causing the mass sleep; at one point, one of the gang attempts to stake Angel during a fight, with the group as a whole 'joking' about Gunn's long absence from the main group and only tolerating Angel's presence as long as Gunn vouches for him.
In one chapter, while interrogating an employee working the graveyard shift at Los Angeles International Airport, Angel uses the pseudonym Herb Saunders. In Buffyverse canon, he used this alias as a goofy, slightly hyperactive tourist in Sense & Sensitivity in order to get the drop on Tony Papazian and his men and help Kate arrest them. This time, he uses the alias as an L.A.P.D. detective.
 The novel mentions that MacKenna (the main villain of the story) managed to expertly organize Los Angeles's vampire population for the first time since the Slayer had killed the Master.

Canonical issues

Angel books such as this one are not usually considered by fans as canonical. Some fans consider them stories from the imaginations of authors and artists, while other fans consider them as taking place in an alternative fictional reality. However unlike fan fiction, overviews summarising their story, written early in the writing process, were 'approved' by both Fox and Joss Whedon (or his office), and the books were therefore later published as official Buffy/Angel merchandise.

External links

Reviews
Litefoot1969.bravepages.com - Review of this book by Litefoot
Teen-books.com - Reviews of this book
Shadowcat.name - Review of this book

Angel (1999 TV series) novels
2002 American novels
2002 fantasy novels
Novels by Jeff Mariotte